In statistics, a proper linear model is a linear regression model in which the weights given to the predictor variables are chosen in such a way as to optimize the relationship between the prediction and the criterion. Simple regression analysis is the most common example of a proper linear model.  Unit-weighted regression is the most common example of an improper linear model.

Bibliography 

Regression models